Allocasuarina campestris, commonly known as the Shrubby she-oak, is a shrub of the she-oak family Casuarinaceae native to Western Australia.

The shrub is found widely throughout the Mid West, Wheatbelt, and the south west of the Goldfields-Esperance regions of Western Australia]].

Allocasuarina campestris is used in gardens and grows in sandy or gravelly soils and is grown from seed.

The species was first formally described as Casuarina campestris by the botanist Ludwig Diels in 1904. It was reclassified in 1982 in the genus Allocasuarina by Lawrence Alexander Sidney Johnson in the Journal of the Adelaide Botanic Gardens.

References

campestris
Fagales of Australia
Rosids of Western Australia
Taxa named by Ludwig Diels
Plants described in 1904